Julio Oscar Mechoso (May 31, 1955 – November 25, 2017) was a Cuban actor who played detective Ruiz in Bad Boys and appeared in such films as Blue Streak, Jurassic Park III, The Legend of Zorro, The Lost City, Little Miss Sunshine and Rules Don't Apply. He had over 120 well known films and TV roles.

Biography
Mechoso was a character actor in both television and film. He appeared in dozens of films, such as Grindhouse, Bad Boys, where he played Detective Ruiz, Blue Streak, Heartbreakers, Jurassic Park III, the controversial Ken Park, The Lost City, The Legend of Zorro, Little Miss Sunshine, Transpecos and Rules Don't Apply. His television credits include Miami Vice, Coach, Damon, Seinfeld, Grey's Anatomy, Cane, The Big Bang Theory, Miami Medical, Matador, where he played Javi Sandoval, and Greetings from Tucson, where he played Joaquin Tiant. He frequently collaborated with Andy Garcia and Robert Rodriguez.

Mechoso died of a heart attack at his home in Burbank, California, at the age of 62.

Filmography

 1983 Guaguasi as Ernestico
 1984-1988 Miami Vice as Lester Kosko
 1986 Flight of the Navigator as Hangar Guard #1
 1988 Police Academy 5: Assignment Miami Beach as Shooting Range Cop
 1990 Internal Affairs as Cousin Gregory
 1990 The Take (TV Movie)
 1990 Midnight Caller (TV Series) as Ozzie Minoso
 1992 Live! From Death Row (TV Movie) as Reyes
 1992 Deep Cover as Detective Hernandez
 1992 Toys as Cortez
 1994 Dead Connection as Linen Suit
 1994 A Perry Mason Mystery: The Case of the Lethal Lifestyle (TV Movie)
 1994 A Million to Juan as Corn Seller
 1994 Menendez: A Killing in Beverly Hills (TV Movie) as Lieutenant Arguello
 1994 The Glass Shield as Assistant District Attorney
 1995 Seinfeld (TV Series) as Julio
 1995 Bad Boys as Detective Ruiz
 1995 A Pyromaniac's Love Story as Jerry
 1996 White Squall as Girard Pascal
 1997 Vegas Vacation as Limo Driver
 1997 'Til There Was You as Mover
 1997 Mad City as Air Force Sergeant
 1997 Switchback as Jorge Martinez
 1998 Krippendorf's Tribe as Professor Simon Alonso
 1999 Virus as "Squeaky"
 1999 Molly as Baseball Fan
 1999 Blue Streak as Detective Diaz
 2000 For Love or Country: The Arturo Sandoval Story (TV Movie) as Jaime Arrondo
 2000 All the Pretty Horses as Captain Raul
 2001 Heartbreakers as Leo
 2001 Tortilla Soup as Gomez
 2001 Jurassic Park III as Enrique Cardoso
 2002 Pumpkin as Dr. Frederico Cruz
 2002 Ken Park as Peaches' Father
 2002 Phone Booth as Medic
 2002 Assassination Tango as Orlando
 2003 Bookies as Martinez
 2003 Once Upon a Time in Mexico as Nicholas, Presidential Advisor
 2003 A Simple Choice (Short) as Gus
 2005 Lords of Dogtown as Mr. Alva
 2005 Wheelmen as Mario
 2005 The Lost City as Colonel Candela
 2005 The Legend of Zorro as Frey Felipe
 2005 Ghost Whisperer (TV Series) as Gilbert de la Costa
 2006 Little Miss Sunshine as The Mechanic
 2006 Grey's Anatomy (TV Series) as Chuck Eaton
 2006 The Virgin of Juarez as (Uncredited)
 2006 Good Cop, Bad Cop as Ramirez
 2007 The Go-Getter as Sergio Leone
 2007 Grindhouse as Romy (segment "Planet Terror")
 2007 Her Best Move as Umberto
 2007 Rise: Blood Hunter as Arturo
 2007 The Death and Life of Bobby Z as Detective Martinez
 2007 Planet Terror as Romy
 2008 Winged Creatures as Detective Cavalis
 2009 Nip/Tuck (TV Series) as Dr. Hans
 2009 Janky Promoters as John Glanville
 2010 The Big Bang Theory (TV Series) as Police Officer
 2010 Fire Bay as Agustino
 2011 Magic City Memoirs as Alejandro Acosta
 2011 Wizards of Waverly Place (TV Series) as DMV Instructor
 2012 The Baytown Outlaws as "Padre"
 2012 A Dark Truth as The Guide
 2013 Machete Kills as Chepo
 2014 Last Weekend as Hector Castillo
 2014 Cake as Dr. Mata
 2014 The Forger as Raul Carlos
 2016 Transpecos as Miguel Herandez
 2016 Rules Don't Apply as President Anastasio Somoza Debayle
 2017 Inheritance as Teddy's Father (final film role)

See also
List of people from Miami

References

External links

1955 births
2017 deaths
American male film actors
American male television actors
American entertainers of Cuban descent
Hispanic and Latino American male actors
Male actors from Miami
20th-century American male actors
21st-century American male actors